Nashville Township is a township in Barton County, Missouri, USA.  As of the 2000 census, its population was 396.

Nashville Township takes its name from Nashville, Tennessee.
Laid out by Thomas and Squire Baker on January 28, 1869

Geography
According to the USGS, it contains two cemeteries: Pierce and Shapley.

References

 USGS Geographic Names Information System (GNIS)

External links
 US-Counties.com
 City-Data.com

Townships in Barton County, Missouri
Townships in Missouri